Concierto de Aranjuez is a composition for classical guitar and orchestra by Joaquín Rodrigo.

Concierto de Aranjuez may also refer to:
Concierto de Aranjuez, an album by the German band Cusco
Concierto de Aranjuez (Paco de Lucía album)
Concerto d'Aranjuez / Sounds of Spain, a 1967 album released by the Paris-based Swingle Singers (released as Spanish Masters in the U.S.) 
Concierto de Aranjuez, a 1984 album by Dorothy Ashby

See also
Miles Davis' interpretation of the Adagio from Concierto de Aranjuez is included in the 1960 album, Sketches of Spain.